Cosmetic camouflage is the application of make-up creams and/or powders to conceal colour or contour irregularities or abnormalities of the face or body. It offers an answer to solve all related skin problems  such as Congenital origin, Traumatic origin and Dermatological origin ( angiomas, couperose, redness, teleangectasy, vitiligo, skin dyschromia, sunspots, senile spots, acne, results of burns, stretch-mark, scars, bruises, blue stains, eye sockets, tattoos). Furthermore, cosmetic camouflage solves  the psychological problems that a skin imperfection is sometimes able to provoke, it allows to rediscover its own beauty and to return with serenity to its own social life.
Cosmetic camouflage creams were first developed by plastic surgeons during World War II to cover the massive burns received by fighter pilots. Nowadays, men, women and children can use cosmetic camouflage.

Examples
 Birthmarks – A birthmark is a blemish on the skin formed after birth. Port wine stains are a type of birthmark characterized by large, splotchy, wine colored marks. They can be camouflaged to quite an extent with a green concealer.
 Rosacea – Rosacea is a skin condition that results in dilated facial blood vessels with redness sometimes combined with pustules. A green concealer should be applied to the affected areas to neutralize redness.
 Vitiligo
 Chloasma
 Cutaneous lupus erythematosus
 Jessner lymphocytic infiltrate
 Veins
 Burns – A burn is a type of injury to the skin caused by heat, electricity, chemicals, light, radiation or friction. It can be camouflaged using green concealer.
 Scarring from surgery, trauma, acne, etc. A scar results from the biologic process of wound repair in the skin and other tissues of the body. Thus, scarring is a natural part of the healing process. E.g. Blepharoplasty (Eye lift). Blepharoplasty gives a completely new look to the face by removing the crepey, laggy skin & tired looks of the eyes. Green concealer should be used sparingly in the area where there is redness. It is preferable not to use kohl or mascara for at least 3–4 weeks after surgery.
 Tattoos – A tattoo is a marking made by inserting indelible ink into the dermis layer of the skin to change the pigment for decorative or other reasons. Tattoos on humans are a type of decorative body modification.
 Many other dermatological conditions.

Cosmetic camouflage is also called camouflage makeup, cover makeup, or corrective makeup.

References

Further reading
 
 
 

Cosmetics
Plastic surgery